Nebulosa yanayacu is a moth of the family Notodontidae first described by James S. Miller in 2008. It is found along the eastern slope of the Ecuadorian Andes.

The length of the forewings is 12–14 mm for males and 12.5–14.5 mm for females. The ground color of the forewings is dark brown. The outer margin of the hindwings has a wide, dark chocolate-brown border.

The larvae feed on Tibouchina lepiota. They have a light green body and a wide yellow dorsal band, within which are pinkish-purple transverse spots on all body segments.

Etymology
The species is named for the type locality, Yanayacu Biological Station. Yanayacu is a Kichwa word meaning Black River.

References

Moths described in 2008
Notodontidae of South America